The Bluejacket MS 23, also called the Bluejacket Motorsailer 23 and the Bluejacket 23 MS, is a Canadian trailerable sailboat that was designed by William Garden as a motorsailer and first built in 1984.

The design is a development of the earlier Garden-designed Family Cat 23.

Production
The design was initially built by Halman Manufacturing in Beamsville, Ontario, Canada. Later it was produced by Collingwood Yachts, in Collingwood, Ontario, but it is now out of production. 
The boat was hand-built on an order basis and it is thought that fewer than ten boats were completed in total.

Design
The Bluejacket MS 23 is a recreational motorsailer, built predominantly of fibreglass, with wood trim. It has a masthead sloop rig, a slightly reversed raked stem, a sharply angled transom, a keel-mounted rudder controlled by a tiller from the cockpit and a wheel from the wheelhouse. The wheel can be disconnected to allow tiller steering. It has a fixed long keel, displaces  and carries  of ballast.

The design has sleeping accommodation for three people, with a double "V"-berth in the bow cabin. The main cabin has a dinette table, that can be converted into a third berth. The galley is located on the starboard side, just forward of the companionway ladder. The galley is equipped with a two-burner stove, a  icebox and a sink. The enclosed head is located just aft of the bow cabin on the starboard side.

Operational history
In a 2010 review Steve Henkel wrote, "best features: The accommodations offer great comfort
for two. The furniture is mostly single function so, for example, you don't have to fold up your berth before you can have breakfast, or unfold the dinette (though the dinette does convert into a third berth if desired) ... Worst features: The towing weight of around 8,500 lbs (including 2,500 lbs. for stowed gear and the trailer itself) is a hefty load to pull, requiring a truck or SUV equivalent."

See also
List of sailing boat types

References

Keelboats
Motorsailers
1980s sailboat type designs
Sailing yachts
Trailer sailers
Sailboat type designs by William Garden
Sailboat types built by Halman Manufacturing
Sailboat types built by Collingwood Yachts